Whitmore Lake Secondary School is a public secondary school in Whitmore Lake, Michigan. It serves grades 7-12 and is part of Whitmore Lake Public Schools.

History
Whitmore Lake Secondary School moved to a new building for the commencement of classes in fall of 2006.

Athletics
The Whitmore Lake Trojans compete in the Tri-County Conference. The school colors are red and white. The following MHSAA sanctioned sports are offered:

Baseball (boys)
Basketball (boys & girls)
Bowling (boys & girls)
Competitive cheer (girls)
Cross country (boys & girls)
Girls state champion - 1993, 1995, 1996
Football (boys)
Golf (boys)
Lacrosse (boys)
Softball (girls)
Swim and dive (boys)
Track and field (boys and girls)
Volleyball (girls)

References

External links

Whitmore Lake Public School District

Public high schools in Michigan
School buildings completed in 2006
Schools in Washtenaw County, Michigan
Schools in Livingston County, Michigan
2006 establishments in Michigan